Carbonic anhydrase 4 is an enzyme that in humans is encoded by the CA4 gene.

Function 

Carbonic anhydrases (CAs) are a large family of zinc metalloenzymes that catalyze the reversible hydration of carbon dioxide.  They participate in a variety of biological processes, including respiration, calcification, acid-base balance, bone resorption, and the formation of aqueous humor, cerebrospinal fluid, saliva, and gastric acid.  They show extensive diversity in tissue distribution and in their subcellular localization.  CA IV is a glycosylphosphatidyl-inositol-anchored membrane isozyme expressed on the luminal surfaces of pulmonary (and certain other) capillaries and of proximal renal tubules.  Its exact function is not known, however, it may have a role in inherited renal abnormalities of bicarbonate transport.

CA IV has been identified in pulmonary epithelium of many mammalian species and may be uniquely adaptive for gas exchange necessary for the high metabolic requirements of mammals. A majority of the  produced by metabolism is transported as bicarbonate. At the tissue capillary,  diffuses from tissue to plasma. Other forms of carbonic anhydrase enzyme are not present in the plasma, restricting the equilibrium reaction of + =  = H+ .  in the plasma diffuses into the Red Blood Cell. Blood moves from the tissue capillary to the pulmonary capillary where  is exchanged at the lung. In the pulmonary capillary, bicarbonate can not simply diffuse either into the Red Blood Cell or the alveoli. It is traditionally thought that  is returned to the interior of the Red Blood Cell by a reversal of the /Cl- shuttle, where, in the presence of CA, it is returned to a  form to diffuse from the interior of the Red Blood Cell, to the plasma and then into the alveoli.

Interactions 

CA4 has been shown to interact with Band 3.

References 

Send to

Further reading

External links 
  GeneReviews/NCBI/NIH/UW entry on Retinitis Pigmentosa Overview